The Chitra Vichitra Fair is an annual tribal fair held in northern Gujarat, India. The fair is an event for families who have lost a member in the past year to mourn the departed, accompanied by festivities and matchmaking. The fair attracts around 60,000 visitors, primarily tribal populations from surrounding villages in Gujarat and Rajasthan.

The fair is held in Gunbhankhari village of poshina taluka, Sabarkantha District, Gujarat, near the Gujarat-Rajasthan border. The site of the fair is on the banks of the Wakal River, and the location is considered sacred because of the confluence of three rivers in the area - Sabarmati, Wakal, and aakal

The fair occurs over the two days abutting the first eve of the new moon (Amavasya) following the festival of Holi, which typically falls in March or April in the Gregorian calendar. The fair commences on the eve of the new moon, when families submerge ashes of their departed family members in the river and mourn their passing through the night. The next day, a fair takes place at the location.

References

External links
  Gujarat Tourism
Vichitra Tribal Fair Of Gujarat Part 1 - A Journey from Moksha to Maya

Festivals in Gujarat
Fairs in India